Frank Seymour Luckins (24 April 1912 – 1 July 1998) was an Australian rules footballer who played with Hawthorn in the Victorian Football League (VFL).

Notes

External links 

1912 births
1998 deaths
Australian rules footballers from Victoria (Australia)
Hawthorn Football Club players
Bairnsdale Football Club players
Australian military personnel of World War II
Military personnel from Victoria (Australia)